The American Federation of Motorcyclists (AFM) is the oldest motorcycle road racing club in the United States.  The AFM was founded in 1954 in part by John McLaughlin, a member of the AMA Motorcycle Hall of Fame. The AFM holds several sanctioned events per year at Buttonwillow Raceway and Thunderhill Raceway. Depending on the year, events have also been held at Sonoma Raceway and Laguna Seca.

The AFM features one of the most progressive class structures in the motorcycle racing industry and features one of the largest contingency and class sponsorship programs of any racing club in the United States.

Many AFM competitors hold a current AMA Professional racing license and some of their racers actively race abroad.

The American Federation of Motorcyclists is a professional racing club with an experienced technical inspection staff, many of whom are certified technical inspectors with the American Motorcyclist Association, World Superbike and MotoGP.  Race Director Barbara Smith has over 30 years of race director experience and is one of the most experienced motorcycle race directors in the United States.  The AFM facilitates a mentor program for newer racers to enhance their transition from being a motorcycle enthusiast to becoming a motorcycle racing competitor and the AFM endeavors to maintain a benevolence fund to assist injured racers.

Athletes
National and international racers and champions have raced at AFM events.  Current and previous professional athletes  include Eric Bostrom, Jason Pridmore, Cameron Beaubier, Cameron Gish, Tucker Lancaster, Melissa Paris (Hayes), Joey Pascarella, Eddie Lawson, Wayne Rainey, Kenny Roberts, Steve Rapp, Sebastio Ferreira, Jake Schmotter, CJ Weaver, Shane Turpin and many more.

External links
AFM Official Web Site
AFM History Site

Sports organizations of the United States
Motorcycle racing organizations
Motorcyclists organizations
Motorcycle racing in the United States